Øyslebø og Laudal is a former municipality in Vest-Agder county, that was located in the old Vest-Agder county in Norway. The  municipality existed from 1838 until 1899. The administrative centre was the village of Øyslebø. The municipality was located in part of the present-day municipality of Lindesnes in Agder county.

Name
The municipality name is an amalgamation of the two parishes that make up the municipality: Øyslebø and Laudal. The parish of Øyslebø is named after the old Øyslebø farm, where Øyslebø Church is located.  The name is derived from the old river name, .  The parish of Laudal is named after the old Laudal farm, where Laudal Church is located.  The first element of the name comes from the old name for the river, Laug, (now the Lågåna river) and the last element means "valley". Therefore, the name means "Laug river valley".

History
The parish of Øslebø og Løvdal was established as a municipality on 1 January 1838 (see formannskapsdistrikt law). According to the 1835 census, the parish had a population of 1,895.  The spelling of the name was later changed to Øyslebø.  On 1 January 1899, Øyslebø og Laudal was split to create two new municipalities: Øyslebø (population: 991) and Laudal (population: 836). These two municipalities later merged with the majority of Bjelland and a portion of Finsland to form the new municipality of Marnardal.

See also
List of former municipalities of Norway

References

External links

Lindesnes
Former municipalities of Norway
1838 establishments in Norway
1899 disestablishments in Norway